List of individuals with title Infanta of Spain (Infanta de España) by birth or marriage since the reign of Carlos I, under whom the crowns of Castile and Aragon were united, forming the Kingdom of Spain. Individuals holding the title of Infanta are often styled Royal Highness (Alteza Real).

Infantas of Spain by birth

Infantas of Spain by marriage

See also
 Monarchy of Spain
 House of Bourbon
 House of Habsburg-Spain

Spanish infantas
Spanish royalty